The men's 3000 metres steeplechase event at the 2019 European Athletics U23 Championships was held in Gävle, Sweden, at Gavlehov Stadium Park on 12 and 14 July.

Medalists

Results

Heats
Qualification: First 5 in each heat (Q) and next 5 fastest (q) qualified for the final.

Final

References

1500
Steeplechase at the European Athletics U23 Championships